Luke Brown (20 January 1902 – 6 March 1978) was an Australian rules footballer who played with Fitzroy in the Victorian Football League (VFL).

Notes

External links 
		

1902 births
1978 deaths
Australian rules footballers from Victoria (Australia)
Fitzroy Football Club players